CLOP is a 2012 Flash game made by Australian game designer Bennett Foddy. It is a sequel of sorts to the viral QWOP, released by Foddy four years prior, in which the player is tasked with controlling a unicorn rather than an athletic runner.

See also
 GIRP, another similar game by Foddy

References

External links
 CLOP on Foddy's personal web site

2012 video games
Fiction about unicorns
Flash games
Horse-related video games
Browser games
Parody video games
Video games developed in Australia
Video game sequels